Ane Cathrine "Anna" Sterky née Nielsen (1856–1939) was a Danish-Swedish politician (Social Democrat), trade union organiser, feminist and editor, chiefly active in Sweden.

Sterky worked as a seamstress in Denmark, where she was active in the Danish trade union movement. In 1891, she moved to Sweden with the Swedish trade union organiser Fredrik Sterky, with whom she had a relationship; they never married, but she used his surname. 

She was a pioneer in her work to build up trade unions for women, and she also worked for the creation of a social democratic women's group within the party. She was a member of the Swedish Social Democratic Party from 1900 to 1925, chairwoman of the Women's Trade Union (1902–1907), editor of the magazine Morgonbris together with Maria Sandel (1904–1909) and honorary chairwoman of the Social Democratic Women in Sweden (1920–1925).

References

 Gunhild Kyle och Eva von Krusenstjerna (1993). Kvinnoprofiler. Norstedts Tryckeri AB Stockholm: Natur & Kultur. . 
 Stig Hadenius, Torbjörn Nilsson & Gunnar Åselius (1996). Sveriges historia. Borås: Bonnier Albs. .

Further reading 
 

1856 births
Swedish Social Democratic Party politicians
Swedish trade unionists
1939 deaths
20th-century Swedish women politicians
20th-century Swedish politicians
19th-century Swedish politicians
Swedish feminists
Swedish people of Danish descent
Socialist feminists
19th-century Swedish women politicians